Ecotropism or ecotropic (from eco – hearth and tropic – to turn towards) refers to the philosophy that for human culture to be healthy, it must exist as in an ecological niche and thereby relate appropriately with all the fields of forces of nature, organic and inorganic. The following form of the term has been used since 1990 in the publication of "Toward an Ecotropic Poetry", by John Campion and John Herndon.

Ecotropism can also indicate that a pathogen, like a virus or a bacterium, has a narrow host range and can infect one or a small group of species or cell culture lines.

See also 
 Tropism, a list of tropisms
 Amphotropism, indicating a wide host range
, link to early ecotropic essay and ecotropic concepts

References

Virology

^ "Ecotropic Works (an anthology of Ecotropic Works" Ed. John Campion. Ecotropic Works   (2010)